Mark McCormick (born April 13, 1933) is a former justice of the Iowa Supreme Court who served from 1972 to 1986.

Early career 
After graduating from Villanova University, McCormick served for three years as an officer in the United States Navy. He graduated from Georgetown University Law Center in 1960, then clerked on the United States Court of Appeals for the Eighth Circuit for Judge Harvey M. Johnsen. McCormick then returned to Fort Dodge and practiced law from 1961 to 1968, during which he was also an Assistant Webster County attorney.

Judicial career 
From 1968 to 1972, McCormick served as a judge of the Iowa District Court. In 1972, Robert D. Ray appointed McCormick to the Iowa Supreme Court.

Return to private practice and political career 
In 1986, McCormick retired from the Iowa Supreme Court to join the Des Moines firm Belin, Harris, Helmick & Tesdell as a partner. In 1997, the firm was renamed Belin Lamson McCormick Zumbach Flynn, before being renamed once more to Belin McCormick. In private practice, McCormick was rated in Band 1 for commercial litigation by Chambers & Partners.

He published a treatise on jury selection and articles in the Iowa Law Review and the Drake Law Review. He also argued before the Supreme Court of the United States in Fitzgerald v. Racing Association of Central Iowa in 2002.

In 1998, McCormick ran in the Democratic primary to be Governor of Iowa and narrowly lost to Tom Vilsack. In 2003, he ran for Mayor of Des Moines and narrowly lost again to Frank Cownie. In 2010, McCormick advocated for the retention of the justices of the Iowa Supreme Court in response to the backlash over Varnum v. Brien.

References

External links

Justices of the Iowa Supreme Court
Living people
1933 births
Politicians from Des Moines, Iowa